Lachnocnema durbani, the D'Urban's woolly legs, is a butterfly of the family Lycaenidae. It is found from Cape Point and KwaZulu-Natal to Mozambique to Kenya, Malawi, Tanzania, and Uganda. The habitat consists of grassy areas in savanna.

Adults are on wing year-round in warmer areas with peaks in spring and late summer.

The larvae prey on Coccidae and Membracidae species.

References

External links

Seitz, A. Die Gross-Schmetterlinge der Erde 13: Die Afrikanischen Tagfalter. Plate XIII 65 g

Miletinae
Butterflies described in 1887
Butterflies of Africa
Taxa named by Roland Trimen